Stadio Romeo Neri is a multi-use stadium in Rimini, Italy.  The stadium has a capacity of 9,768 and is largely used for football as the home of A.C. Rimini 1912. The stadium itself was named after Italian gymnast Romeo Neri, the first citizen of Rimini to participate in the Olympic Games - in both Amsterdam (1928) and Los Angeles (1932).

References

External links
 

Rimini F.C. 1912
Romeo Neri
Buildings and structures in Rimini
Sports venues in Emilia-Romagna